Channel 65 refers to several television stations:

Canada
The following television stations operate on virtual channel 65 in Canada:
 CITY-DT-3 in Ottawa, Ontario

See also
 Channel 65 virtual TV stations in the United States

65